HLA-B40 (B40) is an HLA - B serotype. B40 is composed of the B60 and B61 split antigen serotypes.

Serotype

B*40:05 is poorly recognized by B40, B60, or B61.

References

6